Clydesdale East is one of the 20 electoral wards of South Lanarkshire Council. Created in 2007, the ward elects three councillors using the single transferable vote electoral system and covers an area with a population of 13,165 people

The ward has been a Conservative stronghold with the party winning two of the three seats in 2007 and 2017.

Boundaries
The ward was created following the Fourth Statutory Reviews of Electoral Arrangements ahead of the 2007 Scottish local elections. As a result of the Local Governance (Scotland) Act 2004, local elections in Scotland would use the single transferable vote electoral system from 2007 onwards so Clydesdale East was formed from an amalgamation of several previous first-past-the-post wards. It contained the majority of the former Carstairs/Carnwath ward as well as all of the former Biggar/Symington and Black Mount and Duneaton/Carmicheal wards. Clydesdale East covers a large, rural and sparsely populated area in the southern- and eastern-most parts of South Lanarkshire next to its boundaries with Dumfries and Galloway, the Scottish Borders, West Lothian and East Ayrshire. The largest settlement in the ward is Biggar and it includes the villages of Abington, Carnwath, Carstairs, Carstairs Junction, Cleghorn, Crawford, Leadhills, Symington and Thankerton. Following the Fifth Statutory Reviews of Electoral Arrangements ahead of the 2017 Scottish local elections, the ward's boundaries were not changed.

Councillors

Election results

2022 election

2017 election

2012 election

2007 election

Notes

References

Wards of South Lanarkshire
Clydesdale
Leadhills
Biggar, South Lanarkshire